The Sicao Fortress is a former fort in Annan District, Tainan, Taiwan.

History
The fortress was built during the First Opium War in 1840 during the Qing Dynasty rule of Taiwan by Commander Yao Ying to prevent British Empire troops from invading Taiwan. The fort was initially constructed as a temporary gun platform. However, later on an outer wall made of solid granite was constructed and an inner wall made of pebbles was also added.

Architecture
The fortress has 13 around gun holes.

See also
 List of tourist attractions in Taiwan

References

1840 establishments in Taiwan
Forts in Tainan
Military installations established in 1840
National monuments of Taiwan